The Arctic Giant (1942) is the fourth of seventeen animated Technicolor short films based upon the DC Comics character of Superman, originally created by Jerry Siegel and Joe Shuster. This animated short was created by Fleischer Studios. The story runs nine minutes and covers Superman's adventures defeating a giant dinosaur that terrorizes the city. It was originally released February 27, 1942. The short depicts a Godzilla-esque scenario while predating the 1954 film by 12 years.

Plot
The story begins as the narrator tells about an "Arctic Giant" found frozen in perfect condition millions of years ago in Siberia. The monster is shipped to the Museum of Natural Science in Metropolis, where it is kept frozen using special refrigeration equipment. The people look at the giant monster in the museum. Although the nameplate on the monster's case says "Tyrannosaurus", the dinosaur-like monster does not look like an actual Tyrannosaurus, being green-colored with an upward posture, large arms, and plantigrade feet, so it may be possible that they thought it was a Tyrannosaurus, but it was something else.

Lois Lane is sent to do a story on the monster because it is possible that if the ice were to thaw, it might still be alive. As she is leaving the Daily Planet, Clark asks if she wants him to come with her, but Lois says "No, thanks. You'd probably faint if you saw the monster. You scare so easily". Then once she leaves the room, Clark says "Maybe she's right. But Superman hasn't fainted yet".

At the museum, Lois is shown around the refrigeration plant that is responsible for keeping the monster frozen. The guide shows her the generator, and then proceeds to show her the control room downstairs. He places an oil can on a shelf right next to the generator. As the guide shows Lois' control room, he explains that any rise in temperature could be dangerous. Meanwhile, the shelf that the oil can is on is vibrating from the generator's movement, causing the oil can to move closer and closer to the turbine. The oil can falls into the turbine, jamming it. The workers nearby turn off the equipment so they can quickly repair the damage, but they are not quick enough. The temperature rises from freezing to melting to DANGER level. The ice around the monster begins to melt. Police officers escort everyone out of the museum, except Lois. As she attempts to call the Daily Planet from the museum, the monster destroys the entire building, leaving her in the rubble.

The monster escapes as a police squad starts to shoot at it, but the bullets have no effect due to its thick skin. The monster begins to march towards the officers making them flee as the monster's foot comes down, crushing a mailbox, a streetlight, and the police cars which causes gasoline to leak out of them. The monster begins to wreak havoc throughout the city, destroying a train station and damaging buildings. Back at the Daily Planet, Perry White tells Clark he'd better get on over to the museum to see if Lois is alright. Clark goes into a closet and changes into Superman, then hurries over to the museum and rescues Lois from the rubble. He tells her to go back to the Daily Planet building where she'll be safe, but Lois, always looking for a good story, doesn't listen to Superman.

As Superman leaps from building to building, the monster approaches a dam that is neighboring a small town. The monster destroys the dam, flooding the town while crushing some houses underfoot. Superman stops the flooding by pushing a giant boulder in to fill the gap. The monster continues its rampage through a lake, marching towards a suspension bridge. The fire department tries to slow down the monster by spraying it with high pressure hoses, but the monster is immune and capsizes the firefighter boats. The monster breaks through the suspension bridge, endangering several motorists. Superman then catches the falling bridge and ties it back together, saving the people on it.

As the monster approaches a nearby baseball stadium, Superman uses one of the bridge cables to trip it. The monster falls, crushing cars and a gas station. While the monster is tied up on the ground, Lois stands by to take a picture. The monster's head falls right next to Lois and the monster tries to eat her. Superman flies into the monster's mouth and takes Lois out, telling her to stay put this time. Superman then pins the monster over a lamp post and the city is saved.

Later at the Daily Planet, Lois and Clark are discussing the article Lois wrote about the monster which states that the monster is being held at the Metropolis Zoo. Clark says to Lois: "You showed plenty of courage getting that monster story, Lois" and Lois quotes: "Thanks, but where were you?" Clark replies "Me? Oh, I must have fainted".

Cast
 Bud Collyer as Clark Kent / Superman, Reactor Worker #1, Police Officer #1, Police Dispatcher
 Joan Alexander as Lois Lane, Female Pedestrian
 Julian Noa as Perry White, Male Pedestrian, Police Officer #2
 Jackson Beck as the Narrator, Reactor Worker #2

References

External links
 
 
 The Arctic Giant at the Internet Archive
 The Arctic Giant at the Internet Movie Database

1942 short films
1942 animated films
1940s American animated films
1940s animated short films
1940s animated superhero films
1940s monster movies
Superman animated shorts
Films set in the Arctic
Animated films about dinosaurs
Fleischer Studios short films
American horror short films
Short films directed by Dave Fleischer
Paramount Pictures short films
American monster movies
Rotoscoped films
Giant monster films
American animated short films
1940s English-language films